Graham Cox may refer to:

 Graham Cox (judge) (born 1933), Scottish judge
 Graham Cox (footballer, born 1959), football goalkeeper
 Graham Cox (Australian footballer) (1933–1973), Australian rules footballer